Stefan Govan Humphries (born January 20, 1962) is a former American football player.  He played college football at the University of Michigan, principally as an offensive guard, from 1980 to 1983.  He also played five seasons in the National Football League (NFL) as an offensive guard for the Chicago Bears from 1984 to 1986 and for the Denver Broncos from 1987 to 1988.

Early years
Humphries was born in Fort Lauderdale, Florida, in 1962, and attended St. Thomas Aquinas High School in that city.

University of Michigan
He enrolled at the University of Michigan in 1980 and played college football on Bo Schembechler's Michigan Wolverines football teams from 1980 to 1983.  As a freshman, he was a defensive lineman for the 1980 Michigan Wolverines football team that compiled a 10–2 record and was ranked #4 in the final AP Poll. As a sophomore, Humphries was converted to the offensive guard position where he played for the remainder of his career.  After his junior year, he was selected by both the conference coaches (UPI) and media (AP) as a first-team player on the 1982 All-Big Ten Conference football team.  As a senior, he was again selected by the AP as a first-team All-Big Ten player.

Humphries was also an outstanding student while attending the University of Michigan, and in 1984, he was a recipient of the NCAA Top Five Award, honoring five outstanding senior student-athletes in the Class of 1984.

Professional football
Humphries was selected by the Chicago Bears in the third round (71st overall pick) of the 1984 NFL Draft. He played three seasons for the Bears from 1984 to 1986, appearing in 25 games, none as a starter. He was a part of the 1985 Bears team that won Super Bowl XX.  He was also a member of the "Shuffling Crew" in the video The Super Bowl Shuffle. He spent most of the 1986 NFL season on injured reserve after suffering a foot injury in preseason training camp.  He was reactivated at the end of November and appeared in four games.

In August 1987, the Bears traded Humphries to the Denver Broncos in exchange for punter Bryan Wagner.  He appeared in seven games, all as the Broncos' starting right guard, during the 1987 NFL season.  He appeared in only one game for the Broncos in 1988, having been placed on injured reserve status after the first game of the season.  In August 1989, the Broncos announced Humphries' retirement.

Later years
After a career in football, Humphries attended University of Colorado School of Medicine and completed a residency in physical medicine and rehabilitation at the Mayo Clinic.  He is currently the medical director for Renown Rehabilitation Hospital in Reno, Nevada.

References

1962 births
Living people
African-American physicians
American rehabilitation physicians
American football offensive linemen
Chicago Bears players
Denver Broncos players
Michigan Wolverines football players
University of Colorado Denver alumni
Players of American football from Fort Lauderdale, Florida
Humphries, Stefan
African-American players of American football
21st-century African-American people
20th-century African-American sportspeople